Euseius transvaalensis is a species of mite in the family Phytoseiidae.

References

transvaalensis
Articles created by Qbugbot
Animals described in 1964